Blue John is an album by American organist John Patton recorded in 1963 but not released on the Blue Note label until 1986.

Reception
The AllMusic review by Steve Huey awarded the album 4½ stars and stated "While the grooving interplay between Patton, Green, and Dixon is as instinctive as ever, Braith's piercing, honking stabs are what really liven up the proceedings, giving Blue John  a crazed sense of fun that makes it one of Patton's most infectious and enjoyable records".

Track listing
All compositions by John Patton except as indicated
 "Hot Sauce" (George Braith) – 7:55
 "Bermuda Clay House" (Braith) – 5:55
 "Dem Dirty Blues" (Grant Green) – 6:15
 "Country Girl" – 6:51
 "Nicety" (Ben Dixon) – 5:30
 "Blue John" – 7:55
Recorded at Rudy Van Gelder Studio, Englewood Cliffs, New Jersey on July 11 (tracks 5 & 6) and August 6 (tracks 1–4), 1963.

Personnel
John Patton – organ
Tommy Turrentine – trumpet (5, 6)
George Braith – soprano saxophone, stritch
Grant Green – guitar
Ben Dixon – drums

References

Blue Note Records albums
John Patton (musician) albums
1986 albums
Albums recorded at Van Gelder Studio
Albums produced by Alfred Lion